Delverne "Del" Dressel is an American lacrosse player and a National Hall of Fame member, inducted in 2002.

Career

Dressel played midfielder for the Johns Hopkins University helping the team to NCAA Men's Lacrosse Championship titles in 1984 and 1985. Dressel was an exceptional midfielder who excelled at both offense and defense, playing before the game changed to specialized offensive and defensive specialists. He was awarded the Lt. Donald McLaughlin Jr. Award as the nation's top midfielder in both 1984 and 1985.  

Dressel is one of only seven college players to be named a first-team All-American four times, the others being Doug Turnbull (Johns Hopkins, 1922–25), Everett Smith (St. John's, 1933–37), Frank Urso (Maryland, 1973–76), Jason Coffman (Salisbury St., 1993–96), Michael Powell (Syracuse, 2001–04) and Trevor Baptiste (Denver, 2015-2018).

Dressel ended his career at Hopkins as one of their all-time top scorers with 99 goals and 75 assists for 174 points.

Dressel attended Gilman School, was a two time High School All American and honored with the C. Markland Kelly award designating the best high school lacrosse player in Maryland. After a brief enrollment at Harvard, Dressel transferred to Johns Hopkins. Dressel was also a First-Team Baltimore All-Metro pick at defensive back, while at Gilman. He was named to the Maryland state Athletic Hall of Fame in 2007. Dressel's brothers, Mark and John, also played lacrosse at Johns Hopkins. While at Gilman, Dressel played with future National Lacrosse Hall of Famers Mac Ford and Joe Seivold.

He would later go on to Tulane University medical school in 1990.

Dressel briefly was head coach at the prep school level, at Brentwood School.

Statistics

Johns Hopkins University

Awards
1983 USILA First Team All-American
1984 USILA First Team All-American
1985 USILA First Team All-American
1986 USILA First Team All-American
Dressel is one of only seven college lacrosse four-time first team All-Americans

See also
 Johns Hopkins Blue Jays
 Johns Hopkins Blue Jays lacrosse
 1983 NCAA Division I Men's Lacrosse Championship
 1984 NCAA Division I Men's Lacrosse Championship

References

Living people
Year of birth missing (living people)
Johns Hopkins Blue Jays men's lacrosse players
Tulane University alumni